Garnick is a surname. Notable people with the surname include:

 Diane Garnick (born 1967), American investment manager

See also
 Garrick (name)
 Gornick